Revelle Sabine Balmain (11 July 1972 – 5 November 1994) was an Australian model, dancer and escort who mysteriously disappeared from the Sydney suburb of Kingsford in early November 1994. Balmain has never been heard from since.

Background
Balmain was planning on visiting Japan for her fourth cabaret tour for six weeks as a hostess. She had been working as a part-time model and as an escort to establish herself, and she was planning on finishing escort work so that she could fully concentrate on her showbusiness career.

On 5 November 1994, Balmain, who was living in Sydney, had arranged to meet her mother at Newcastle Station for lunch. She did not arrive on the train as expected. At 4:00 pm the same day, Balmain, who worked as an escort under the name of "Mischa", visited a client in the south-eastern Sydney suburb of Kingsford.

After the two-hour appointment was over, she had planned to meet her friend, Kate Brentnall, for a drink. At 7:15 pm, Balmain rang Brentnall to say that she was about to leave her client and suggested that they meet at the Royal Hotel, Paddington. She did not keep that appointment.

Investigation
On the following day, 5 November, Balmain's bag, make-up, diary, credit cards, and keys to her Bellevue Hill flat were found scattered around several Kingsford streets. One of her shell-studded platform shoes was retrieved from one street; the other shoe was found in another street. 

Police interviewed Balmain's client, who said that he had driven her to the nearby Red Tomato Inn at about 7.00 pm on the evening of 5 November. As the booking was from 4.00-6.00, it was unclear if Balmain had moonlighted for the additional hour. Police officers also questioned the escort agency's owners, but the enquiries resulted in no charges being laid.

After a couple of fruitless weeks of searching, the New South Wales government offered a reward of $100,000 for anyone who could provide information that would lead to the arrest of Balmain's killer. As of 14 May 2021, the reward stood at $1,000,000.

In May 1999, the Deputy State Coroner, John Abernethy, handed down an open finding into Balmain's presumed death. The coronial inquiry, however, suggested that the final client she had visited that day was a primary suspect, but fell short of recommending charges. 

Items belonging to Balmain, including her keys, passport, and plane ticket were also found in the vicinity of her final client’s residence. In 2008, forensic evidence suggested that Balmain was murdered in her final client’s house. Members of Balmain's family also believe that there were major flaws in the police investigation of the disappearance.

See also
List of people who disappeared

References

External links
Australian Missing Persons Register profile
Model Revelle Balmain last seen in Kingsford in 1994 | 7NEWS - YouTube

1990s in Sydney
1990s missing person cases
1994 in Australia
1994 murders in Australia
Crimes against sex workers
Incidents of violence against women
Missing person cases in Australia
Murder in Sydney
People from Manly, New South Wales
Australian models
Women in Sydney
Violence against women in Australia